Marguerite de la Sablière (– 8 January 1693), was a French salonist and polymath, friend and patron of Jean de La Fontaine, was the wife of Antoine Rambouillet, sieur de la Sablière (1624–1679), a Protestant financier and poet entrusted with the administration of the royal estates, her maiden name being Marguerite Hessein.

Biography 
She received an excellent education in Latin, mathematics, physics and anatomy from the best scholars of her time. For example, Joseph Sauveur and Gilles Personne de Roberval taught her mathematics, physics, and astronomy. Her house became a meeting-place for poets, scientists and men of letters, no less than for brilliant members of the court of Louis XIV.

About 1673 de la Sablière received into her house La Fontaine, whom for twenty years she relieved of every kind of material anxiety. Another friend and inmate of the house was the traveller and physician François Bernier, whose abridgment of the works of Gassendi was written for Mme de la Sablière. The abbé Chaulieu and his fellow-poet, Charles Auguste, marquis de La Fare, were among her most intimate associates.

Nicolas Boileau-Despréaux mocked her scientific pretensions in his Satire contre les femmes holding an astrolabe, her efforts to observe Jupiter were portrayed as weakening her sight and ruining her complexion. In reply, Charles Perrault's Apologie des femmes defended her.

La Fare sold his commission in the army to be able to spend his time with her. This liaison, which seems to have been the only serious passion of her life, was broken in 1679. La Fare was seduced from his allegiance, according to Mme de Sevigné by his love of play, but to this must be added a new passion for the actress La Champmeslé.

Mme de la Sablière thenceforward gave more and more attention to good works, much of her time being spent in the hospital for incurables. Her husband's death in the same year increased her serious tendencies, and she was presently converted to Roman Catholicism. She died in Paris on 8 January 1693.

Milk in tea
She was credited with starting the custom of putting milk into tea in her salon, allegedly to prevent her eggshell teacups from cracking.

Publications

See also
 Timeline of women in science

Notes

References

External links
"La Sablière, Marguerite Hessein de" article in the Internet Encyclopedia of Philosophy

French salon-holders
1693 deaths
Year of birth uncertain
1640 births
French women scientists
17th-century women scientists
French philanthropists
17th-century philanthropists